Androlaelaps is a genus of mites in the family Laelapidae.

Species

 Androlaelaps alexandrini (Fox, 1946)
 Androlaelaps setosus (Fox, 1946)
 Androlaelaps angustotactus Karg, 1994
 Androlaelaps anomalis (Wang, Liao & Lin, 1981)
 Androlaelaps anourosorecis (Gu & Wang, 1981)
 Androlaelaps anticlea (Domrow, 1972)
 Androlaelaps bayoumi Basha & Yousef, 2001
 Androlaelaps bellasoma (Sakamoto, Jorgensen & Herrin, 1979)
 Androlaelaps benedictae Fain & Hart, 1988
 Androlaelaps bidens (Domrow, 1980)
 Androlaelaps boleensis (Ye & Ma, 1996)
 Androlaelaps brevicaudae Karg, 1990
 Androlaelaps brevitrematicus Karg, 1990
 Androlaelaps calypso (Domrow, 1966)
 Androlaelaps capillatus Karg, 1993
 Androlaelaps capromydis de-la-Cruz, 1981
 Androlaelaps casalis (Berlese, 1887)
 Androlaelaps casaloides Karg, 1993
 Androlaelaps caurinus (Sakamoto, Jorgensen & Herrin, 1979)
 Androlaelaps cehengensis (Gu, 1983)
 Androlaelaps chaetospinicus (Sakamoto, Jorgensen & Herrin, 1979)
 Androlaelaps chersonesi (Domrow, 1980)
 Androlaelaps circularis (Ewing, 1933)
 Androlaelaps cleptusa (Domrow, 1972)
 Androlaelaps concurrens Berlese, 1918
 Androlaelaps crocidura (Sakamoto, Jorgensen & Herrin, 1979)
 Androlaelaps crowei (Jameson, 1947)
 Androlaelaps cryptomius Radford, 1939
 Androlaelaps cubicularis (Berlese, 1887)
 Androlaelaps cuicensis Gettinger, 1997
 Androlaelaps debilis (Jameson, 1950)
 Androlaelaps deomys Fain & Hart, 1988
 Androlaelaps desmodilliscus (Sakamoto, Jorgensen & Herrin, 1979)
 Androlaelaps domesticus (Berlese, 1887)
 Androlaelaps domrowi (Womersley, 1958)
 Androlaelaps ebsi (Sakamoto, Jorgensen & Herrin, 1979)
 Androlaelaps elongatus Berlese, 1918
 Androlaelaps euryplatamus Yang & Li, 1992
 Androlaelaps extremitatis Karg, 1991
 Androlaelaps extremus Karg, 1990
 Androlaelaps fahrenholzi (Berlese, 1911)
 Androlaelaps flagellatus (Womersley, 1958)
 Androlaelaps foenalis (Berlese, 1887)
 Androlaelaps fragilis (Chen, Bai & Gu, 1995)
 Androlaelaps hattenae (Domrow, 1963)
 Androlaelaps hermaphrodita (Berlese, 1887)
 Androlaelaps hollisteri (Ewing, 1925)
 Androlaelaps ilhacardosoi Gettinger & Martins-Hatano, 2003
 Androlaelaps jamesoni (Furman, 1955)
 Androlaelaps kathuensis Jordaan, 1988
 Androlaelaps kivuensis Fain & Hart, 1988
 Androlaelaps laertes (Domrow, 1972)
 Androlaelaps latiporus (Bai & Gu, 1993)
 Androlaelaps lehfini Oyoun & El-Kady, 1995
 Androlaelaps longoventris Karg, 1978
 Androlaelaps machadoi (Till, 1972)
 Androlaelaps machaeratus (Domrow, 1957)
 Androlaelaps malachela (Sakamoto, Jorgensen & Herrin, 1979)
 Androlaelaps marmosops Martins-Hatano, Gettinger & Bergallo, 2001
 Androlaelaps marsupialis (Berlese, 1910)
 Androlaelaps marsupialis Berlese, 1910
 Androlaelaps martini (Jameson, 1951)
 Androlaelaps minutiventralis (Gu, 1983)
 Androlaelaps novemspinosus Li, Yang & Zhang, 1998
 Androlaelaps orientalis Ibrahim & Abdel-Samad, 1990
 Androlaelaps pachyptilae (Zumpt & Till, 1956)
 Androlaelaps palaniae (Domrow, 1981)
 Androlaelaps paracasalis (Ryke, 1963)
 Androlaelaps parahirsti (Sakamoto, Jorgensen & Herrin, 1979)
 Androlaelaps parasingularis Gu & Wang, 1996
 Androlaelaps paraxeri Fain & Hart, 1988
 Androlaelaps penelope (Domrow, 1964)
 Androlaelaps petauristae (Gu & Wang, 1980)
 Androlaelaps pilosus Baker, 1991
 Androlaelaps praeporus (Gu & Wang, 1981)
 Androlaelaps pulchriventris Karg, 1978
 Androlaelaps pumilionis Karg, 1993
 Androlaelaps qinghaiensis (Yang & Gu, 1985)
 Androlaelaps quartus (Domrow, 1961)
 Androlaelaps rahmi Fain & Hart, 1988
 Androlaelaps rohaniae (Domrow, 1980)
 Androlaelaps sanduensis (Gu & Wang, 1981)
 Androlaelaps schaeferi (Till, 1969)
 Androlaelaps sciuricola Fain & Hart, 1988
 Androlaelaps sclerotarsus (Gu & Bai, 1995)
 Androlaelaps sikapusi (Sakamoto, Jorgensen & Herrin, 1979)
 Androlaelaps singularis Wang & Li, 1965
 Androlaelaps singuloides Gu & Duan, 1991
 Androlaelaps sisyphus (Domrow, 1981)
 Androlaelaps spinosus (Furman, 1955)
 Androlaelaps subpavlovskii Liu, Ma & Ding, 2000
 Androlaelaps subterraneus (Berlese, 1920)
 Androlaelaps taterakempi (Sakamoto, Jorgensen & Herrin, 1979)
 Androlaelaps telemachus (Domrow, 1964)
 Androlaelaps trifurcatoides Yan & Ma, 1999
 Androlaelaps ulixes (Domrow, 1972)
 Androlaelaps ulysses (Domrow, 1961)
 Androlaelaps verneri Dusbabek, Daniel & Till, 1982
 Androlaelaps yiliensis (Ye & Ma, 1996)
 Androlaelaps zhongweiensis (Bai, Chen & Wang, 1987)
 Androlaelaps ziegleri Karg, 1991

References

Laelapidae